DXJR (1575 AM) was a radio station owned and operated by Cagayan de Oro Media Corporation.

History
This station was established in 2005 in Cagayan de Oro with a news and talk format. In February 2010, it was relaunched as Media Higala and adopted a TeleRadyo format, with its programs simulcast over TV-39. In 2012, it went off the air. In 2014, Rizal Memorial Colleges Broadcasting Corporation took over the station's operations and relaunched it as Radyo ni Juan Northern Mindanao. It relocated its operations to Brgy. Damilag, Manolo Fortich.

In September 2017, the Rural Missionaries of the Philippines-Northern Mindanao Region, Kalumbay Regional Lumad Organization and Kodao Productions took over the station's operations and rebranded it as Radyo Lumad, serving as the community station for the Lumad. It transferred its operations to Brgy. Dahilayan. It carried news and commentaries from the Radyo ni Juan network every morning, while carrying local programming for the rest of the day. In January 2019, Radyo Lumad went off the air because of threats and harassment from allies of the government.

References

Radio stations in Bukidnon
Radio stations established in 2005
Radio stations disestablished in 2019